Live in Liverpool may refer to:

Live In Liverpool, a 1989 concert video by The Shadows
Live in Liverpool (Echo & the Bunnymen album)
Live in Liverpool (Gossip album)